Francis James "Frank" Maher (18 June 1929 – 13 July 2007) was a British stuntman who was best known for his roles as a stuntman or stunt coordinator in many British television shows including Danger Man (US: Secret Agent) and The Prisoner; he was frequently the stunt double for the series star Patrick McGoohan.

Early career
He was born in London on 18 June 1929. He was a gold medal-winning boxer at school. Before his career as a stuntman/actor he served in World War II in the Parachute Regiment of the British Army. He lied about his age to join the regiment which meant that he was only 15 when he took part in the battle of Arnhem (part of Operation Market Garden).

His first stunt role was as a Roman Centurion in the film Caesar And Cleopatra (1945) starring Stewart Granger. His other movie stunt roles included work on The Crimson Pirate (1952) doubling for Burt Lancaster and as a riding double in The Devil’s Disciple (1959).

His later movie stunt roles included work on The Italian Job in 1969.

TV stuntman
As a stuntman on The Avengers, he played opposite both Honor Blackman and Diana Rigg. After working on Man in a Suitcase, he became stunt coordinator on Department S and Randall and Hopkirk (Deceased).

Following his work on Danger Man, he again doubled for Patrick McGoohan in the TV series The Prisoner (1967–68). He had a particularly large role in the episode "The Schizoid Man", which required a doppelganger of McGoohan's Number Six character to have a lot of screen time alongside the "real" Number Six.

He also appeared as "Third Gunman" in The Prisoner western/cowboy style episode "Living in Harmony". He claimed to have suggested the idea of having a western/cowboy style episode to McGoohan.

Maher also served as a stuntman / stunt coordinator / stunt arranger on a number of other TV programmes, including: Blake's 7, The Persuaders!, The Champions, Robin Hood, The Saint and Space 1999.

On The Saint (1962–69), he replaced Les Crawford as Roger Moore's double. Moore nicknamed him "Mrs Maher" because of his very careful planning of each stunt sequence.

He also worked as the fight arranger in the first of the BBC Northern Ireland Billy Plays "Too Late to Talk to Billy" in 1982, in which Billy was played by Kenneth Branagh.

Author and writer
In the late 1970s, he co-wrote several novels in the thriller genre including The Capricorn Run (also known as The Hook) in 1978, Wipe-Out! in 1980 and Sahara Strike in 1980.

He also wrote action sequences for films, including Die Hard.

Family
He married four times. His first marriage was to actress Dilys Laye. He had one son, Gary, and one daughter, Stephanie, with his second wife Jackie, who was a dancer.

Death
He died on 13 July 2007 at St Mary's Hospital in Newport on the Isle of Wight after a long period suffering from emphysema.

Filmography

References

External links
 

1929 births
2007 deaths
English stunt performers
Deaths from emphysema
British Army personnel of World War II
British Parachute Regiment soldiers